Gary Unmarried is an American sitcom created by Ed Yeager, which ran on CBS from September 24, 2008, to March 17, 2010. The series focuses on a recently divorced couple (Jay Mohr and Paula Marshall) sharing custody of their kids while starting new relationships. The show was produced by ABC Studios and CBS Television Studios, and Yeager and Ric Swartzlander served as executive producers for the first season. The series was known as Project Gary during tapings before premiering on television.

On May 18, 2010, CBS canceled the series after two seasons.

Premise
The series centers around the life of Gary Brooks (Jay Mohr) and begins three months after he and his ex-wife, Allison Brooks (Paula Marshall), officially divorce. Gary owns a house painting business and bought his own place after his divorce. Now his life revolves around trying to move on from his marriage and get back out into the dating scene while constantly having to deal with his ex-wife because they have two children together.

For these reasons, he has difficulty adjusting to life without Allison, and matters are not helped by their still-antagonistic relationship. Despite their acrimonious relationship and constant flinging of cracks at each other, Gary and Allison affectionately make up at the end of most of their conflicts, as the two seem to have a soft spot for each other underneath all their hostility.

Their teenagers are sent back and forth between them so as to spend time with each parent. Their teenage son, Tom, is a brash 14-year-old who's already had a girl in his bedroom (though at the advice of his father), has tried drinking beer, spoken to Gary as if he's Gary's father, and has even spoken to one of Gary's girlfriends (Vanessa) in a flirtatious manner. Louise, their precocious 12-year-old daughter, is an intellectual who plays the cello, keeps photos of Mahatma Gandhi, Al Gore and Che Guevara on her bedroom walls, and watches C-SPAN.

Allison considers Gary to be irresponsible in his parenting while Gary considers Allison to be boring in her parenting; this is shown whenever they pick up their kids from the other's house. In the pilot episode, Gary starts dating a young divorced mom, Vanessa Flood, while Allison reveals that she's engaged to their former marriage counselor, Dr. Walter Krandall (Ed Begley Jr.). Tom begins a romance of his own when he invites a girl over for the first time. The three couples move forward uncertainly. Vanessa, however, breaks up with Gary after a short-lived relationship because of his inability to quit worrying about Allison.

In Season 2, Gary lands an on-air job at a local sports talk radio station, and eventually starts dating the station's new, young manager, Sasha.

History
The first season ran from September 24, 2008, to May 20, 2009. The series aired Wednesdays at 8:30pm ET, following fellow CBS sitcom The New Adventures of Old Christine. They replaced the reality show Kid Nation. After an initial order of 13 episodes, CBS announced its order for seven more episodes of Gary Unmarried on November 14, 2008, calling it a full season pickup. On January 7, 2009, the show won the "Favorite New TV Comedy" award at the 35th People's Choice Awards, beating one season cancellations Kath & Kim and Worst Week. On May 10, 2009, it was announced that executive producers Yeager and Swartzlander had left the series over creative differences.

On May 19, 2009, it was announced that Gary Unmarried was officially picked up by CBS for a second season. Season 2 premiered on Wednesday, September 23, 2009, at 8:30pm ET. It was replaced on the schedule by Accidentally on Purpose in March 2010, and was officially cancelled on May 18 of that year (alongside Accidentally on Purpose and The New Adventures of Old Christine).

Cast

Main cast
Gary Brooks (Jay Mohr): A juvenile, wisecracking, loving, but sneaky, scheming, dishonest divorced father, who's often on some misadventure to keep out of trouble. Despite his deceptiveness and sneakiness, more often than not Gary is caught and fails miserably, resulting in him forcefully trying to justify his actions at the end of most situations. Gary enjoys drinking beer, sports, and playing games with his guy friends.
Allison Brooks (Paula Marshall): Gary's troublemaking, cynical, sarcastic, and condescending ex-wife and Louise and Tom's mother, who once went on a trip to revisit an "old friend" that she admittedly never got along with—even forcing Gary to involve himself in it. Although generally seen behaving antagonistically and spitefully towards Gary, Allison has a tender side and is needy in terms of love, affection, and emotional support.
Curtis (Keegan-Michael Key): An old friend of Gary who works at a radio station. (Season 2).
Sasha (Brooke D'Orsay): The young, gorgeous, overwhelmed radio station manager. (Season 2).
Tom Brooks (Ryan Malgarini): Gary and Allison's brash teenage son who can be just as loving and caring as his mom but can also be just as witty and quick on the draw as his dad.
Louise Brooks (Laura Marano in the pilot; Kathryn Newton from episode 2 onward): Gary and Allison's sassy daughter; a straight-A student and precocious environmentalist.
Mitch Brooks (Rob Riggle): Gary's half-brother, a former Marine coming back to the United States. He lives in Gary's house, bunking in his nephew's room. He also works with Gary as a house painter.

Former main cast
Vanessa Flood (Jaime King): Gary's first post-divorce understanding, affable girlfriend, whom he has a lot in common with and met when his company painted her condo. Much like Gary, she has a child from a previous marriage and has a negative relationship with her ex-husband. Though Vanessa is good-humored for the most part, she isn't the easiest person to get along with when discussing her ex-husband and once almost got into a quarrel with Allison, but Gary broke it up out of concern that Allison would hurt Vanessa. (Season 1)
Dr. Walter Krandall (Ed Begley Jr.): A nerdy, instructive psychiatrist and former marriage counselor to Gary and Allison. He and Allison were engaged, but broke up before getting married. He's fifteen years older than Allison, which Gary doesn't hesitate to make insults about. (Season 1)
Dennis Lopez (Al Madrigal): Gary's witty best friend and coworker. (Season 1)

Notable guest stars
Mitch / Ronnie (David Denman): Vanessa's husband whom she has a very contentious relationship with. In episode 6 (Gary Meets The Gang), Mitch unwelcomely shows up at the restaurant where Vanessa works. Unaware that it was Vanessa's ex-husband, Gary befriends him. Later on in the episode, Mitch treacherously reveals to Vanessa all the comments Gary made about wishing to play the field despite the fact that he knew Gary was dating Vanessa.
Parker Flood (Charles Henry Wyson): Vanessa's violent only son with her ex-husband, Ronnie Mitchell. Parker is first seen when Vanessa brings him over to Gary's house to use the restroom. In episode 9 (Gary Gives Thanks) Parker persistently assaults Tom despite being younger and much smaller than Tom is.
Jack Brooks (Max Gail): Gary's eccentric father, who visited him for Thanksgiving (episode 9). He was lured away by Allison to celebrate Thanksgiving over at her place, in effect causing a lot of chaos.
Joan Plummer (Kathleen Rose Perkins): Louise's favorite teacher who Gary dates after his relationship with Vanessa ends. Gary was originally attracted to Joan's sexy teaching assistant, rather than Joan, who appeared rather plain. To prove to Louise that he wasn't shallow, Gary asked Joan out, discovered that her dowdy clothing hid her attractiveness, but was confronted by Joan, who revealed that she knew Gary was originally interested in the assistant and not her. They eventually dated, however Joan was reluctant to pursue the physical aspect of their relationship.
Charlie (Martin Mull): Allison's discontented, henpecked, fun-loving father. Charlie is a man who's kept from many of his desires because of his wife. He is first seen on Thanksgiving as well. In retaliation for Allison luring Gary's father to her house, Gary lured Charlie to spend Thanksgiving over at his house. Charlie reveled in the freedom he had away from his wife, Connie. Charlie doesn't hesitate to show his dislike for Allison's fiancé Walter. His nickname for Allison is "Alligator."
Ira (Senyo Amoaku): A bouncer at Vanessa's work.
Joe Torre (himself): Torre stars as himself in an episode. Torre visits Gary at the station and gets attacked twice by Gary's brother.

Episodes

U.S. ratings
Ratings based on Live+Same Day.

Seasonal ratings

Season 1: 2008-2009 weekly ratings

Season 2: 2009-2010 weekly ratings

DVD release
On February 9, 2010, Walt Disney Studios Home Entertainment (using the ABC Studios brand) released the complete first season of Gary Unmarried on DVD in Region 1.

International distribution

Awards and nominations
2009 - People's Choice Awards - Favorite New Comedy - Won
2010 - Young Artist Award for Best Performance in a TV Series (Comedy or Drama) Supporting Young Actor-Ryan Malgarini-Won
2010 - Young Artist Award for Best Performance in a TV Series (Comedy or Drama) Supporting Young Actress-Kathryn Newton-Won

References

https://www.ew.com/ew/article/0,,20225070,00.html
https://www.variety.com/article/VR1117994552.html?categoryid=14&cs=1&nid=2565
Marshall overturns her rep as a show killer

External links
 

2008 American television series debuts
2010 American television series endings
2000s American sitcoms
2010s American sitcoms
CBS original programming
English-language television shows
Television series by ABC Studios
Television series by CBS Studios